The Plainview Formation is an Early Cretaceous (Albian) geologic formation of the Dakota Group in Colorado. Fossil ankylosaur tracks and tracks of Caririchnium sp. have been reported from the formation.

Description 
The formation overlies the Lytle Formation and is overlain by the Glencairn Formation and comprises resistant, brown-weathered sandstones, and dark shales and siilstones, also described as bioturbated brownish sandstones with black and grey silty or shaley sandstone intervals. The formation was deposited in a variety of near-shore and/or marginal marine environments. The tracks occur in the upper part of an estuarine point bar sequence, overlain by brackish bay or lagoon deposits.

See also 
 List of dinosaur-bearing rock formations
 List of stratigraphic units with ornithischian tracks
 Ankylosaur tracks

References

Bibliography 

  
 
 

Geologic formations of Colorado
Lower Cretaceous Series of North America
Cretaceous Colorado
Albian Stage
Sandstone formations
Shale formations
Siltstone formations
Lagoonal deposits
Ichnofossiliferous formations
Paleontology in Colorado